Jeff Clarke may refer to:

 Jeff Clarke (businessman) (born 1961), American businessman
 Jeff Clarke (Canadian soccer) (born 1977), Canadian soccer player
 Jeff Clarke (English footballer) (born 1954), English footballer who played for Sunderland and Newcastle United
 Jeff Clarke (actor), Canadian actor

See also 
 Geoff Clark (disambiguation)
 Jeff Clark (disambiguation)